The 2022 Oklahoma State Cowboys baseball team will represent Oklahoma State University during the 2022 NCAA Division I baseball season. The Cowboys play their home games at O'Brate Stadium as a member of the Big 12 Conference. They are led by head coach Josh Holliday, in his tenth season at Oklahoma State.

Previous season 

The 2021 team finished the season with a 36–19–1 record and a 12–12 record in the Big 12. In the 2021 Big 12 Conference baseball tournament, the fourth-seeded Cowboys made a run to the finals where they fell to second-seeded TCU 7–10. They earned an at-large bid into the 2021 NCAA Division I baseball tournament, where they were seeded second in the Tucson Regional. There, the Cowboys were eliminated by third-seeded UC Santa Barbara.

Player Movement

Departures 
To be announced

Transfers

Signing day recruits 
The following players signed National Letter of Intents to play for Oklahoma State in 2022.

Personnel

Roster

Coaching staff

Schedule and results

Rankings

References

External links 
 OK State Baseball

Oklahoma State Cowboys
Oklahoma State Cowboys baseball seasons
Oklahoma State Cowboys baseball
Oklahoma State